Aaron Parks (born October 7, 1983) is an American jazz pianist.

Career
A native of Seattle, Parks studied at the University of Washington at the age of 14 through the Transition School and Early Entrance Program as a double major in computer science and music. At 15 he was selected to participate in the Grammy High School Jazz Ensembles which inspired him to move to New York City and transfer to the Manhattan School of Music. At Manhattan one of his teachers was Kenny Barron. During his final year he began touring with  Terence Blanchard's band, recording three albums with him for Blue Note, including the Grammy-winning A Tale of God's Will (A Requiem for Katrina). Parks can be heard on the soundtracks to Their Eyes Were Watching God and the Spike Lee films Inside Man, She Hate Me, and When the Levees Broke. 

Parks released his first four albums on Keynote Records between 1999 and 2002. In 2008, he released Invisible Cinema, his debut for Blue Note. Following this he released two albums for ECM, and is currently an artist on Ropeadope Records.

He is a member of the band James Farm with saxophonist Joshua Redman, bassist Matt Penman, and drummer Eric Harland. He has toured with guitarist Kurt Rosenwinkel.

Awards and honors 
 2001: Cole Porter Fellow of the American Pianists Association
 2006: Thelonious Monk International Jazz Piano Competition (third place)
 Jas Hennessy Piano Solo Competition at Montreux (third place)
 2016: DownBeat magazine: “25 for the Future”

Discography

As leader

Main sources:

As member 
James Farm
With Joshua Redman, Matt Penman and Eric Harland
 James Farm (Nonesuch, 2011)
 City Folk (Nonesuch, 2014)

As sideman 

With Terence Blanchard
 Bounce  (Blue Note, 2003)
 Flow (Blue Note, 2005) – recorded in 2004
 A Tale of God's Will (A Requiem for Katrina) (Blue Note, 2007)

With Mike Moreno
 Between the Lines (World Culture Music, 2007) – recorded in 2006
 First in Mind (Criss Cross, 2011)
 Another Way (World Culture Music, 2012)
 Lotus (World Culture Music, 2015)

With Christian Scott
 Anthem (Concord Jazz, 2007)
 Live at Newport (Concord Jazz, 2008) – live

With Dayna Stephens
 Today Is Tomorrow (Criss Cross, 2012)
 Reminiscent (Criss Cross, 2015)
 Right Now! (Contagious Music, 2020)

With others
 Ambrose Akinmusire, Prelude (Fresh Sound, 2008)
 Monika Borzym, Girl Talk (Sony, 2011)
 Francesco Cafiso, Angelica (CAM Jazz, 2009)
 Cant, Dreams Come True (Terrible, 2011)
 Terri Lyne Carrington, Waiting Game (Motema, 2019)
 Anders Christensen Trio, Dear Someone (Stunt, 2009)
 Nir Felder, Golden Age (Okeh, 2014)
 Gilad Hekselman, Ask for Chaos (Motema, 2018)
 Derrick Hodge, Live Today (Blue Note, 2013)
 Lage Lund, Foolhardy (Criss Cross, 2013)
 Chris Morrissey, North Hero (Sunnyside, 2013)
 Ferenc Nemeth, Night Songs (Dreamers Collective 2007) – recorded in 2005
 Gretchen Parlato, In a Dream (ObliqSound, 2009) – recorded in 2008
 Kurt Rosenwinkel, Star of Jupiter (Wommusic 2012)[2CD]
 Yeahwon Shin, Lua Ya (ECM, 2013) – recorded in 2012
 Walter Smith III, Casually Introducing (Fresh Sound, 2006)
 Ben Wendel, The Seasons (Motema, 2018)
 Dhafer Youssef, Diwan of Beauty and Odd (Okeh, 2016)

References

External links
 Official site
 Aaron Parks at NPR Music

1983 births
American jazz pianists
American male pianists
Living people
Musicians from Seattle
21st-century American pianists
21st-century American male musicians
American male jazz musicians